Joseph John Sisco (October 31, 1919 – November 23, 2004) was a diplomat who played a major role in then-Secretary of State Henry Kissinger's shuttle diplomacy in the Middle East. His career in the State Department spanned five presidential administrations.

Diplomatic career
Sisco had served for a year as an officer of the Central Intelligence Agency before joining the State Department in 1951, where he served as a foreign affairs officer until 1965, when he was promoted to Assistant Secretary of State for International Organization Affairs by Dean Rusk. In 1969, he was promoted to Assistant Secretary of State for Near Eastern Affairs. He left the government in 1976, and served as the President of American University until 1980.

Private sector career
In June 1980, he joined CNN as a columnist, appearing occasionally on air as an expert on Middle Eastern and Asian affairs.

Personal life
Sisco's wife, Jean Head Sisco, whom he married in 1946 while they were students at the University of Chicago, died in 1990.

References

External links

Leaders of American University
1919 births
2004 deaths
Knox College (Illinois) alumni
Lyndon B. Johnson administration personnel
United States Assistant Secretaries of State
Under Secretaries of State for Political Affairs
University of Chicago alumni